Woolsey Bridge (NRHP listed as Washington County Road 35 Bridge) was a truss bridge built in 1925, formerly located near West Fork, Arkansas. It is listed on the National Register of Historic Places.

History
The bridge is historic as the only surviving bridge in the area built in the camelback style. Engineered in a distinct way, the camelback truss is uncommon and this well-preserved example was listed on the National Register of Historic Places on June 9, 2000.

Design

Bridge designers and engineers of the early 20th century had seen the Pratt truss prove itself as a durable and economically feasible bridge. The Woolsey Bridge was designed as a camelback through truss design. The camelback is a modification of the Pratt truss by Charles H. Parker that features a top chord that is not parallel to the bottom chord. Although stronger in the center than parallel bridges, the style is less common due to its complexity. The Woolsey Bridge was likely built by a county workforce in 1925, possibly consisting of area residents.

Status
The bridge was closed to traffic in January, 2015 and a replacement bridge opened in 2018.The old bridge was disassembled and given to the town of West Fork with the intention it would be repurposed into a pedestrian bridge.

See also
List of bridges documented by the Historic American Engineering Record in Arkansas
List of bridges on the National Register of Historic Places in Arkansas
National Register of Historic Places listings in Washington County, Arkansas

References

External links

Road bridges on the National Register of Historic Places in Arkansas
Transportation in Washington County, Arkansas
Bridges completed in 1925
Historic American Engineering Record in Arkansas
National Register of Historic Places in Washington County, Arkansas
Pratt truss bridges in the United States
Metal bridges in the United States
1925 establishments in Arkansas
White River (Arkansas–Missouri)
Relocated buildings and structures in Arkansas